Josiah Bartlett ( – May 19, 1795) was an American Founding Father, physician, statesman, a delegate to the Continental Congress for New Hampshire, and a signatory to the Declaration of Independence and Articles of Confederation. He served as the first governor of New Hampshire and chief justice of the New Hampshire Superior Court of Judicature.

Personal life

Josiah Bartlett was born at 276 Main Street in Amesbury, in the Province of Massachusetts Bay, to Stephen and Hannah-Mary (Webster) Bartlett. His father Stephen was the son of Richard and Hannah (Emery) Bartlett. He was their fifth child and fourth son.  By age 17, he had learned some of both Latin and Greek. He also began the study of medicine, working in the office of Dr. Ordway of Amesbury at the same time. Before Bartlett turned 21, in 1750, he moved to Kingston, New Hampshire, in Rockingham County, and began his practice. Kingston at that time was a frontier settlement of only a few hundred families, and Bartlett was the only doctor in that part of the county at the time. He purchased land and a farm.

On January 15, 1754, he married Mary Bartlett of Newton, New Hampshire. She was his cousin, the daughter of his uncle, Joseph. They would remain married until her death on July 14, 1789. Josiah and Mary had three sons and seven daughters: Mary (1754), Lois (1756), Miriam (1758), Rhoda (1760), Hannah (who died as an infant in 1762), Levi (1763), Josiah (1768), Ezra (1770), Sarah (1773), and Hannah (1776, also died as an infant). All three of his sons and seven of his grandsons would follow him as physicians.

Medical career 

Bartlett actively practiced medicine for 45 years, after having apprenticed with another doctor and then establishing his own practice at age 20. Around 1735, the area around Kingston suffered an epidemic of a fever and canker called throat distemper. For adults it was a serious illness, and for children it was frequently fatal, especially among the very young. When the illness struck again in 1754, Bartlett experimented with therapy using several available drugs and empirically discovered that Peruvian bark would relieve symptoms long enough to allow recovery.

In 1790, Bartlett secured legislation recognizing the New Hampshire Medical Society. He was also elected chief executive of New Hampshire. He served in 1791 and 1792 as president. In 1790, he delivered the commencement address at Dartmouth College when his son Ezra graduated. Bartlett was awarded an honorary Doctorate of Medicine the same day his son was awarded the same degree.

Political career
Bartlett became active in the political affairs of Kingston, and in 1765 he was elected to the colonial assembly. In 1767, he became the colonel of his county's militia, and Governor John Wentworth appointed him justice of the peace. As the Revolution neared, his Whig policies brought him into opposition with Wentworth. Although his lodge is not known, his great-grandson, Levi S. Bartlett, had a letter written by Josiah to his son Ezra saying, "I attended a Mason meeting last night, and as soon as you can I wish you would join the Masons."
In 1774, Bartlett joined the Assembly's committee of correspondence and began his work with the revolutionary leaders of the other 12 colonies. Later that year, when Wentworth dismissed, or prorogued, the Assembly, Josiah was elected to its revolutionary (and illegal) successor, the Provincial Assembly. He also suffered the loss of his home by fire, alleged to have been set by opposition Tories. He moved his family out to the farmhouse and began rebuilding immediately. When the assembly appointed Bartlett and John Pickering as delegates to the Continental Congress, he declined because he wished to attend to his family, but remained active in New Hampshire's affairs. In one of Governor Wentworth's last acts before being expelled from New Hampshire in 1775, he revoked Bartlett's commissions as justice, militia colonel, and assemblyman.

Continental Congress
Bartlett was selected as a delegate again in 1775, and attended that session as well as the meetings in 1776. Indeed, for a time in late 1775 and early 1776, he was the only delegate attending from New Hampshire. Much of the work of the Congress was carried out in committees. The most important of these had a delegate from each state, which meant that Bartlett served on all of them, including those of safety, secrecy, munitions, marine, and civil government.

Eventually, after his continued letters home to the assembly and committee of safety in New Hampshire, William Whipple and Matthew Thornton were added to the delegation in Philadelphia. When the question of declaring independence from Great Britain was officially brought up in 1776, as a representative of the northernmost colony Bartlett was the first to be asked, and he answered in the affirmative. He signed the Declaration of Independence.

In 1777, he declined a return to the Congress, citing fatigue. But when trouble threatened, he used his medical skills and accompanied John Stark's forces to the Battle of Bennington in August. He was re-elected to Congress in 1778 and served on the committee that drafted the Articles of Confederation. But, after the articles were adopted, he returned to New Hampshire to attend to personal business.  This was the last of his federal service. While he was at the Congress in 1776, his wife Mary had managed the farm, seen to the completion of rebuilding their house, cared for nine children, and given birth to Hannah.

Later career
Although he remained in the state after 1778, in 1779 he returned to his role as a judge, serving in the Court of Common Pleas. Then in 1782 he was appointed to the New Hampshire Supreme Court. In 1788, Bartlett was made the chief justice of the state supreme court. That same year he was a delegate to the New Hampshire convention for adoption of the U.S. Constitution, serving part of the time as its chairman. He argued for ratification, which took place on June 21, 1788. The legislature of the new state of New Hampshire selected him to be a U. S. Senator, but he declined the office.

When the new state constitution took effect in 1792, he became governor. He resigned in 1794 after four years because of declining health; he died the next year. During his tenure, he oversaw the installation of a new state constitution, compilation of the laws and statutes in force, and provision for the early payment of the state's debt. He actively promoted agriculture and manufacturing, the improvement of roads, and saw the start of projects to build canals.

Death and legacy

Bartlett retired to his home in Kingston and died there on May 19, 1795. The cause of death was paralysis. He is buried next to his wife Mary in the Plains Cemetery, also at Kingston. Relatives of Bartlett still live in his home; the Josiah Bartlett House was declared a National Historic Landmark in 1971.

A bronze statue of Bartlett stands in the town square of Amesbury, Massachusetts. His portrait hangs in the State House in Concord, New Hampshire, drawn from an original by John Trumbull. Bartlett, New Hampshire, is named in his honor, along with the Josiah Bartlett Elementary School. Bartlett is featured on a New Hampshire historical marker (number 46) along New Hampshire Route 111 in Kingston. The Bartlett School in Amesbury, which operated from 1870 until it was closed in 1968, operates as the Bartlett Museum, Inc., a nonprofit museum.

The main character in the NBC drama series The West Wing, President Josiah Bartlet, is a fictional character depicted as a descendant of the Declaration of Independence signatory.

See also
 Memorial to the 56 Signers of the Declaration of Independence

References

 Leach, Frank Willing. Descendants of the Signers of the Declaration of Independence. Salt Lake City, UT: Filmed by the Genealogical Society of Utah, 1966. Print.

Further reading
 "Papers of Josiah Bartlett"; 1979, Olympic Marketing Corporation; .

External links

 
 Biography by Rev. Charles A. Goodrich, 1856
 Society of Descendants of the Signers of the Declaration of Independence
 
 The Papers of Josiah Bartlett at Dartmouth College Library

1729 births
1795 deaths
Founding Fathers of the United States
People from Amesbury, Massachusetts
People of colonial Massachusetts
People of colonial New Hampshire
American people of English descent
Congregationalists from Massachusetts
Continental Congressmen from New Hampshire
Signers of the Articles of Confederation
Signers of the United States Declaration of Independence
New Hampshire Democratic-Republicans
Democratic-Republican Party state governors of the United States
Governors of New Hampshire
Chief Justices of the New Hampshire Supreme Court
Physicians from Massachusetts
Physicians from New Hampshire
18th-century American physicians
New Hampshire militiamen in the American Revolution
People of New Hampshire in the American Revolution